The U15 was a line on the Berlin U-Bahn. Originally the U3 running between Wittenbergplatz and Uhlandstraße, it became a branch of the U1 in 1993 as part of the reorganisation of the network following the reopening of the U2.

On December 12, 2004, it was renumbered as the U1.

Berlin U-Bahn lines
Railway lines opened in 1993
Railway lines closed in 2004
1993 establishments in Germany
2004 disestablishments in Germany